Aichryson santamariensis is a species of plant endemic to the island of Santa Maria in the Azores. This species was previously part of the similar Aichryson villosum, restricted now only to the neighboring Madeira.

References

santamariensis
Endemic flora of the Azores